Elwood is an unincorporated community in northwestern Clinton County, Iowa, United States. It lies along Iowa Highway 136, northwest of the city of Clinton, the county seat of Clinton County, and 5 miles (8 km) east of Lost Nation.  Its elevation is 738 feet (225 m). It once possessed a post office, established in 1871. Elwood was named in honor of Kinsey Elwood, who platted the town in 1873.

References

Unincorporated communities in Clinton County, Iowa
Unincorporated communities in Iowa
1871 establishments in Iowa
Populated places established in 1871